Naz or NAZ may refer to:

 Naz (name)
 NAZ (studio), Japanese animation studio
 Naz, Iran, a village in Hormozgan Province, Iran
 Naz, Switzerland, in the canton of Vaud
 Naaz islands, a set of tidal islands in the Persian Gulf, south of Iran
 Nakhchivan Automobile Plant, an automobile manufacturer in Azerbaijan
 , a Dutch healthcare database
 A peak in the Alborz mountain range of Iran

See also
 Natz-Schabs, a municipality in South Tyrol, Italy
 
 Nas (disambiguation)